Sings Country and Western Hits is the 1961 country music studio album released in May 1961 by George Jones. The album was Jones' tenth studio album release since his debut LP in 1956. It would be  one of his last with Mercury Records, as he switched to United Artists in late 1961.

The album featured Jones' covers of hits in the "Country and Western Charts," that were previously recorded by his fellow country artists or himself. It featured his second #1 hit "Window Up Above," released the previous year. The LP became one Jones' best sounds during the early 1960s, released after another great album, "Salutes Hank Williams."

Background
Sings Country and Western Hits would be Jones's last album with Mercury. As Colin Escott observes in the liner notes to the Jones retrospective Cup of Loneliness: The Classic Mercury Years, "Mercury lost George just as he was on the verge of ruling the charts. Art Talmadge had left Mercury Records and gone to United Artists and when George's Mercury contract expired at the end of 1961, Pappy (Daily, Jones's producer and mentor) took him to U.A. The first single, the classic "She Thinks I Still Care", was one of seven records George would chart in 1962."

Recording and composition
Window Up Above
Sings Country and Western Hits features hits made famous by other artists but also include songs closely identified with Jones, especially "The Window Up Above".  As the singer explained to Nick Tosches in 1994, "I wrote it in about twenty minutes.  I just came in off the road, about eight in the morning.  While breakfast was being fixed, I just sat down in the den and picked up the guitar, and it was as simple as that.  Sometimes it's hard to even figure where the ideas come from."  In his book George Jones: The Life and Times of a Honky Tonk Legend, Bob Allen notes that when Jones recorded the song in 1960, "he sang it in a taut, almost offhand manner that called to mind the style of one of his heroes, Lefty Frizzell.  He sang it in a manner which merely insinuated the presence of the wild, barely suppressed emotions seething just under the surface..."  The song remained on the country charts for more than eight months, and George even had Nudie Cohn make him a stage suit based on it, a chartreuse affair replete with faces peering forlornly from sequin-stitched window frames.  The song would later be covered by Loretta Lynn, Leon Russell, and Mickey Gilley, whose 1975 rendition would hit number one on the country charts.

Album information
(the following was written on the back of the LP record cover)

The history of country and western music has seen many names emerge as top singing stars. However, only few have risen to such a height that their name will live in country music forever. The first to reach this plateau was the legendary Jimmie Rodgers, who made country music a popular boom. The next artist that would gain a reputation that would make him live forever in the hearts of country music lovers was Hank Williams. William's star rose overnight despite a full field of competition. Hank gained his reputation from not only singing, but also because he wrote songs that would be sung for decades to come, such as; "Cold, Cold Heart," "Half as Much."

When Hank Williams met his untimely end, many wondered who would be the next artist to claim the title of "king of country and western music." The answer was not long in coming—George Jones. George Jones, oddly enough, has the same qualities that made Hank Williams a legend. George not only sings c&w tunes the way they should be sung, but he also is a songwriter of note. Among his compositions are such stellar tunes as "Life to Go," "Just One More," (both were rerecordings during an April 1960 session) Also included in his latest national best selling hit, "Window Up Above." George Jones has proven to be a composer who can write about people, love, and tragedy, and he can also write songs of faith. (Window Up Above was recorded in Early April, 1960)

The country and western field of music is peculiarly for and about people and its music tells about people and their feelings. In the words of a famous critic: "If a country singer can't feel what his audience is feeling, he's neither a country singer, nor a singer." The popularity of country music is, and has been, expanding every year. Through the medium of radio, country music reached into the city and the country. Country music is more and more finding hefty sells in markets. All of this is because country music is universal and country music is universal and country artists with their fellow man on all levels.

A rare talent is required to sell himself to the people on this down-to-earth basis and such a talent is the handsome lad from Beaumont, Texas—George Jones. His first few records saw enjoyed moderate success and then in 1955, George recorded "Why Baby, Why," and the start of his fabulous career took wings. He later joined the WSM Grand Ole Opry and took on a professional polish. By now, his single recordings of "White Lightning" and "Who Shot Sam" were top national hits. Since joining Mercury Records, Jones has recorded four albums, each being greater than the one before and each bringing him a new host of fans. Each album saw George Jones perform in a different character, Gospel, country, his own tunes, and a salute to Hank Williams. Now, in his latest album, George Jones sings the top country and western hits from the past. His voice and his feelings for these numbers are unequalled in bringing you the tops in recorded listening pleasure. Certainly, there can be no better tribute for this kind of music which is "of the people, for the people, and by the people" than to have it sung and played by the greatest —George Jones.

Reception

Eugene Chadbourne of AllMusic writes of Sings Country and Western Hits:  "This is a recording of songs played pure and simple, from the heart and for a little bit of money, and recorded properly but without a lot of production hoopla" and suggest listening to it is the equivalent of going to hear a really great country cover band in which Jones is the lead singer.

Track listing

External links
George Jones' Official Website
Record Label

1962 albums
George Jones albums
Albums produced by Shelby Singleton
Mercury Records albums